William Robert Dixon (October 5, 1925 – June 16, 2010) was an American composer and educator. Dixon was one of the seminal figures in free jazz and late twentieth-century contemporary music. His was also a prominent activist for artist's rights and African American music tradition. He played the trumpet, flugelhorn, and piano, often using electronic delay and reverb.

Biography
Dixon hailed from Nantucket, Massachusetts, United States. His family moved to Harlem, in New York City, in 1934. He enlisted in the Army in 1944; his unit served in Germany before he was discharged in 1946. His studies in music came relatively late in life, at the Hartnette Conservatory of Music (1946–1951), which he attended on the GI Bill. He studied painting at Boston University and the WPA Arts School and the Art Students League. From 1956 to 1962, he worked at the United Nations, where he founded the UN Jazz Society.

In the 1960s Dixon established himself as a major force in the jazz avant-garde. In 1964, Dixon organized and produced the October Revolution in Jazz, four days of music and discussions at the Cellar Café in Manhattan. The participants included pianist Cecil Taylor and bandleader Sun Ra. It was the first free-jazz festival of its kind. Dixon later co-founded the Jazz Composers Guild, a cooperative organization that sought to create bargaining power with club owners and effect greater media visibility. A key participant in the seminal Judson Dance Theater at Judson Memorial Church in Greenwich Village, New York City, Dixon was one of the first artists to produce concerts mixing free jazz and improvisational dance, spending several years in a close collaboration with dancer Judith Dunn, with whom he formed the Judith Dunn/Bill Dixon Company. He recorded relatively little during this period, though he co-led some releases with Archie Shepp and appeared on Cecil Taylor's Blue Note record Conquistador! in 1966. In 1967, he composed and conducted a score for the United States Information Agency film, The Wealth of a Nation, produced and directed by William Greaves.

Dixon was Professor of Music at Bennington College, Vermont, from 1968 to 1995, where he founded and chaired the college's Black Music Division. From 1970 to 1976, he played "in total isolation from the market places of this music," as he puts it. Solo trumpet recordings from this period were later released by Cadence Jazz Records and were collected on his self-released multi-CD set Odyssey, along with reproductions of his visual artwork and other material.

He was one of four featured musicians in the Canadian documentary Imagine the Sound (along with Cecil Taylor, Archie Shepp, and Paul Bley), 1981.

In the later years of his life, he recorded with Cecil Taylor, Tony Oxley, William Parker, and Rob Mazurek.

Dixon was noted for his extensive use of the pedal register, playing below the trumpet's commonly ascribed range and well into the trombone and tuba registers. He also made extensive use of half-valve techniques and used breath with or without engaging the traditional trumpet embouchure. He largely eschewed mutes, the exception being the Harmon mute, with or without stem.

On June 16, 2010, Bill Dixon died in his sleep at his home in North Bennington, Vermont after suffering from an undisclosed illness.

Discography

As leader

As sideman or co-leader 
 Cecil Taylor, Conquistador! (Blue Note, 1968) – recorded in 1966
 Franz Koglmann, Opium for Franz (Pipe, 1977) – recorded in 1976; three tracks were reissued on the compilation Opium (Between the Lines, 2001)
 The Tony Oxley Celebration Orchestra, The Enchanted Messenger: Live from Berlin Jazz Festival (Soul Note, 1995) – live recorded in 1994
 Cecil Taylor and Tony Oxley, Taylor/Dixon/Oxley (Victo, 2002) – live
 Bill Dixon/Aaron Siegel/Ben Hall, Weight/Counterweight (Brokenresearch, 2009)[2LP]
 Cecil Taylor, Duets 1992 (Triple Point, 2019) – recorded in 1992

As producer or composer 
 Robert F. Pozar Ensemble, Good Golly Miss Nancy (Savoy, 1967) – producer
 Ed Curran Quartet, Elysa (Savoy 1968) – recorded in 1967. producer.
 The Marzette Watts Ensemble, The Marzette Watts Ensemble (Savoy, 1969) – recorded in 1968. producer and composer.
 Marc Levin and his Free Unit, The Dragon Suite (BYG Actuel, 1969) – producer
 Jacques Coursil Unit, Way Ahead (BYG, 1969) – composer

References

Further reading 

 Piekut, Benjamin (2001). Experimentalism Otherwise: The New York Avant-Garde and Its Limits. University of California Press. .

External links 
Audio Recordings of WCUW Jazz Festivals – Jazz History Database
"Beyond Abstraction: Bill Dixon on Music and Art: Interviewed by Graham Lock." (July 2010)
"Bill Dixon: In Medias Res" (feature article/interview by Clifford Allen)
Guardian obituary
New York Times obituary
Bill Dixon Papers, Fales Library and Special Collections at New York University Special Collections

1925 births
2010 deaths
American jazz trumpeters
American male trumpeters
American jazz flugelhornists
American jazz pianists
American male pianists
Free jazz trumpeters
Jazz musicians from Massachusetts
People from Nantucket, Massachusetts
Black Saint/Soul Note artists
RCA Records artists
People from Bennington County, Vermont
Avant-garde jazz trumpeters
20th-century trumpeters
20th-century American pianists
Bennington College faculty
20th-century American male musicians
American male jazz musicians
AUM Fidelity artists
Savoy Records artists
RCA Victor artists
FMP/Free Music Production artists
Firehouse 12 Records artists
Thrill Jockey artists